Peter Blackburn (d.1616) was a Scottish scholar and prelate. He was the second Protestant Bishop of Aberdeen.

Life

Born in the east of Scotland he studied at St Andrews University. He became a "regent" (lecturer) in Philosophy at the University of Glasgow in 1572 and continued this role until 1582. During this period he was promoted to Professor of Physics and Astronomy.

In 1582 he became minister of West Kirk in Aberdeen and was translated to the East Kirk in 1596. He was Moderator of the General Assembly of the Church of Scotland 1597/8. In 1600 he was made Chancellor of King's College, Aberdeen.

On 2 September 1600, King James VI of Scotland provided him as Bishop of Aberdeen, attaching to the appointment a seat in the Parliament of Scotland – an innovation which was denounced by Charles Ferme. Another part of the controversy was that no new bishop had been appointed since 1585, and Blackburn's provision, along with those of David Lindsay to the bishopric of Ross and George Gledstanes' provision to the bishopric of Caithness, broke this lull.

He was not formally consecrated until 1611, in a ceremony at Brechin Cathedral. He died at his house in Guestrow, Aberdeen, after a long illness on 14 June 1616, at Aberdeen. He is buried in the Kirk of St Nicholas in central Aberdeen.

Family

He married Isobel Johnston, daughter of George Johnston of Johnston and Caskichen, and Christian Forbes, daughter of Lord Forbes, and sister of the poet Arthur Johnston. Their children included:

Peter Blackburn of Dyce, their heir
William Blackburn of Endowie
Janet Blackburn, married Rev Alexander Rait of Kintore
Archibald Blackburn, minister in Aberdeen
Margaret Blackburn, married Andrew Adie, Principal of Marischal College
Christian Blackburn, married Abraham Sibbald of Old Deer
Elspet
Isobel

Publications

A Treatise against James Gordon the Jesuit

Notes

References
 Gordon, Alexander, "Ferme [Fairholm], Charles (1565/6–1617)", rev. Alan R. MacDonald, Oxford Dictionary of National Biography, Oxford University Press, 2004 , accessed 22 Feb 2007
 Keith, Robert, An Historical Catalogue of the Scottish Bishops: Down to the Year 1688, (London, 1924) 
 MacDonald, Alan R., "Gledstanes , George (c.1562–1615)", in the Oxford Dictionary of National Biography, Oxford University Press, 2004 , accessed 22 Feb 2007

Blackburn, David
Blackburn, David
Blackburn, David
Blackburn, David
Blackburn, David
Blackburn, David
Members of the pre-1707 Parliament of Scotland
16th-century Scottish people
17th-century bishops of the Church of Scotland
Members of the Parliament of Scotland 1612
Moderators of the General Assembly of the Church of Scotland
Scottish bishops 1560–1638